() is the cultural region traditionally inhabited by the Sámi people. Sápmi is in Northern and Eastern Europe and includes the northern parts of Fennoscandia, also known as the "Cap of the North".

The region stretches over four countries: Norway, Sweden, Finland, and Russia. On the north it is bounded by the Barents Sea, on the west by the Norwegian Sea, and on the east by the White Sea. The area is historically referred to as Lapland in English, although the term "Lapp" for its inhabitants is now considered pejorative. Norwegian Sápmi was historically called Finnmǫrk, a name used for the former county Finnmark, now Troms og Finnmark.

Sápmi refers to the areas where the Sámi people have traditionally lived but overlap with other regions and definitions. In practice most of the Sámi population is largely concentrated in a few traditional areas in the northernmost part of Sápmi, such as Kautokeino and Karasjok, with the exception of those who have left for the larger cities. Culturally, Inari is considered one of the centers of Sámi culture, and because of that, it is also widely known as the "capital of Sámi culture".

The Sámi people are estimated to make up only 2.5% to 5% of the total population in the Sápmi area. No political organization advocates secession, although several groups desire more territorial autonomy or more self-determination for the region's indigenous population.

Etymology
Sápmi (and corresponding terms in other Sami languages) refers to both the Sami land and the Sami people. The word "Sámi" is the accusative-genitive form of the noun "Sápmi"—making the name's (Sámi olbmot) meaning "people of Sápmi". The origin of the word is speculated to be related to the Baltic word *žēmē, meaning "land". Also "Häme", the Finnish name for Tavastia, a historical province of Finland, is thought to have the same origin, and the same word is at least speculated to be the origin of "", the Finnish name for Finland.
 
Sápmi is the name in North Sami, while the Julev Sami name is Sábme and the South Sami name is Saepmie.

In modern Swedish and Norwegian, Sápmi is known as "Sameland". In older Swedish it was known as "Lappmarken" or "Lappland". Norwegian Sápmi was historically called Finnmǫrk (not Lapland), a name used for the modern county Finnmark that covers key parts of historical Sápmi. Some English language sources have transferred Lapland (or Lappland) to areas in Norway notably in the context of tourism marketing. Originally these names referred to all of Sápmi, but subsequently became applied to areas exclusively inhabited by the Sami.

"Lappland" (Laponia) became the name of Sweden's northernmost province (landskap) which in 1809 was split into one part that remained Swedish and one part falling under Finland (which became part of the Russian Empire). "Lappland" survives as the name of both Sweden's northernmost province and Finland's, also containing part of the old Ostrobothnian province.

In the 17th century, Johannes Schefferus assumed the etymology of the term "Lapland" to be related to the Swedish word for "running", "löpa" (cognate with English, to leap). The terms "Lapp" and "Lappland" are now regarded as offensive by many Sami people, who prefer the area's name in their own language "", because over time the term "Lapp" has acquired the pejorative connotation of "silly", "uneducated", "backwards", etc. in the major languages of the  Scandinavian countries that include Sapmi.

In older Norwegian, Sápmi was known as "Finnmork" or "Finnmark"; which is now the name of Norway's northernmost county. Northern Norway and Murmansk Oblast are sometimes marketed as Norwegian Lapland and Russian Lapland, respectively.

Geography

Landscape
The largest part of Sápmi lies north of the Arctic Circle. The western portion is an area of fjords, deep valleys, glaciers and mountains, the highest point being Mount Kebnekaise, in Swedish Lapland. The Swedish part of Sápmi is characterized by great rivers running from the northwest to the southeast. From the Norwegian province of Troms and Finnmark and eastward, the terrain is that of a low plateau with many marshes and lakes, the largest of which is Lake Inari in Finnish Lapland. The extreme northeastern section lies within the tundra region, but it does not have permafrost. In the 19th century scientific expeditions to Sápmi were undertaken, for instance by Jöns Svanberg.

Climate
The climate is subarctic and vegetation is sparse, except in the densely forested southern portion. The mountainous west coast has significantly milder winters and more precipitation than the large areas east of the mountain chain. North of the Arctic Circle polar night characterize the winter season and midnight sun the summer season—both phenomena are longer the further north you go. Traditionally, the Sami divide the year into eight seasons instead of four.

Natural resources
Reindeers, wolfves, bears, and birds are the main forms of animal life, in addition to a myriad of insects in the short summer. Sea and river fisheries abound in the region. Steamers are operated on some of the lakes, and many ports are ice-free throughout the year. All ports along the Norwegian Sea in the west and the Barents Sea in the northeast to Murmansk are ice-free all year. The Gulf of Bothnia usually freezes over in winter. The ocean floor to the north and west of Sápmi has deposits of petroleum and natural gas. Sápmi contains valuable mineral deposits, particularly iron ore in Sweden, copper in Norway, and nickel and apatite in Russia.

Cultural subdivisions

East Sápmi
East Sápmi consists of the Kola peninsula and the Lake Inari region and is home to the eastern Sami languages. While being the most heavily populated part of Sápmi, this is also the region where the indigenous population and their culture are weakest. Corresponds to the regions marked 6 through 9 on the map below.

Central Sápmi
Central Sápmi consists of the western part of Finland's Sami Domicile Area, the parts of Norway north of the Saltfjellet mountains and areas on the Swedish side corresponding to this. Central Sápmi is the region where Sami culture is strongest, and home to North Sami—the most widely used Sami language. In the southernmost part of this subregion, however, Sami culture is rather weak—this is where the moribund Bithun Sami language is used. The areas around the Tysfjord fjord in Norway and the river Lule in Sweden are home to the Julev Sami language, one of the more widely used Sami languages. These correspond to the regions marked 3 through 5 on the map below.

South Sápmi
South Sápmi consists of the areas south of Saltfjellet and corresponding areas in Sweden and is home to the southern languages. In this area, Sami culture is mostly visible inland and on the coast of the Baltic Sea, and the languages are spoken by few. Corresponds to the regions marked 1 and 2 on the map below to the southeast of region 1 in Sweden.

Lapland
The inner parts of Sápmi are often referred to as Lappi. The name is also found on the Russian side as Laplandige (the name of a natural reservation) and the Norwegian landscape of Finnmark is sometimes titled the "Norwegian Lapland", especially by the travel industry. Lappi- appears as a common component of place names throughout central and southern Finland as well; in many cases, it probably refers to earlier Sami presence, though in some cases the underlying meaning may be mere "periphery" or "outlying district".

"Sides"
Finally, Sápmi may also be subdivided into cultural regions according to the state's borders, that obviously affects daily life for people no matter their ethnicity. These regions are commonly referred to as "sides" by Sami, for example, "the Norwegian side" (norgga bealli) or "the Finnish side" (suoma bealli).

Languages

Sámi languages

The Saamic languages are the region's main minority languages and also its oldest attested languages. They belong to the Uralic language family and are most closely related to the Finnic languages. Many Sami languages are mutually unintelligible, but the languages originally formed a dialect continuum stretching southwest–northeast, so that a message could hypothetically be passed between Sami speakers from one end to the other and be understood by all. Today, however, many of the languages are moribund and thus there are "gaps" in the original continuum.

On the map to the right numbers indicate Sámi Languages (Darkened areas represent municipalities that recognize Sami as an official language.): 1. South (Åarjil) Sámi, 2. Ume (Upme) Sámi, 3. Pite (Bitthun) Sámi, 4. Lule (Julev) Sámi, 5. North (Davvi) Sámi, 6. Skolt Sámi, 7. Inari (Ánár) Sámi, 8. Kildin Sámi, 9. Ter (Kill) Sámi. Of these languages, the North one is by far the most vital; whereas Ume and Pite seem to be dying languages. Kemi Sámi and Ter Sami are extinct.

North Sami is subdivided into three main dialects: West, East, and Coast. The written standard is based on the Western dialect.

East Slavic languages

Russian is the dominant language on the Russian side of the border and is also spoken by recently immigrated minority groups elsewhere in Sápmi. Earlier, a common pidgin language was spoken on the northern coast of Sápmi that combined elements of Russian and Norwegian. This language was known as Russenorsk. On the Russian side, there are also speakers of the East Slavic Belarusian and Ukrainian languages.

North Germanic (Scandinavian) languages

Norwegian and Swedish dominate the largest part of Sápmi, including the entire Southern region and most of the Central region. There also used to be minorities speaking Norwegian on the Kola Peninsula. The Scandinavian languages are to a very large degree mutually intelligible, much more so than South Sami and North Sami. The Norwegian dialects spoken particularly in North and Central Norway Sami areas differ very much from the written bokmål standard. In Central Sápmi, the Sámi dialects have taken the Scandinavian language trait of having a more or less constant emphasis on the first syllable of each spoken word. In the inner and northernmost parts of Sweden and Norway, however, people often speak Norwegian and Swedish close to the written standard, though with a heavy Uralic accent.

Finnic languages

The Finnic (i.e. Baltic Finnic) languages are spoken on the Finnish (Finnish), Swedish (Meänkieli—spoken by the Tornedalians) and Norwegian (Kven) sides of the borders. There also used to be minorities speaking Finnish on the Kola Peninsula. The languages are as mutually intelligible as the Scandinavian languages. Other Finnic languages include Karelian, Estonian, Livonian, Veps, Votic and Ingrian. Many are mutually intelligible.

Demography
The number of people living in Sápmi is about 2 million, though it is difficult to give the precise number of inhabitants since certain counties and provinces only include parts of Sápmi. It is also difficult to account for the distribution of ethnic groups as many people have double or multiple ethnic identities—both seeing themselves as members of the majority population and being part of one or more minority groups.

Sámi

Different criteria are set when calculating the number of Sámi, but the number is generally between 80,000 and 100,000. Many live in areas outside Sápmi such as Oulu, Oslo, Stockholm and Helsinki. Some Sámi people have migrated to places outside the Sápmi vernacular region, such as Canada and the United States. Many Sámi people have settled in the northern parts of Minnesota.

Russians

About 900,000 people inhabit Murmansk province (oblast'), but parts of this area lie outside Sápmi. About 758,600 of Murmansk's population claim to be exclusively Russian. Ethnic Russians also live elsewhere in Sápmi. The Russian side of Sápmi is ethnically diverse, with particularly big Ukrainian and Belarusian minorities. The Sami are one of the minor minorities in this part of Sápmi.

Norwegians

About 850,000 people inhabit the Norwegian regions of North Norway (fully within Sápmi) and Trøndelag (mostly within Sápmi). However, many of the region's inhabitants—particularly those of North Norway—are not exclusively Norwegian. Notable minority groups include the Sami, Finns, and Kvens.

Swedes

About 700,000 people inhabit the Swedish counties Norrbotten, Västerbotten, Västernorrland, and Jämtland. Many of the counties' inhabitants are not exclusively Swedish. Notable minority groups in the former three counties include the Sami, Tornedalians, and Finns.

Finns

13,226 people inhabit the Sami native region of Lapland, Finland. A great portion of these is Sami.

Tornedalians and Kvens

These two ethnic groups, closely related to each other and also the Finns, mainly live on the Finnish, Swedish and Norwegian sides of Nordkalotten, respectively. In Sweden, there are two meanings to the word "Norrbotten". One is the older "landskap" Norrbotten, which is much smaller than the modern county, "län", Norrbotten, which encompasses all of north Sweden from Jävre. Norrbottens län also encompasses the northern part of the "landskap" Lappland. The modern county Norrbotten has only a small minority of reindeer-herding Sami. The Tornedalians, who have lived, hunted, fished and farmed, mainly south and east of the line of arable climate and land (that line mostly coincides approximately with the border between the two landscapes Lappland and Norrbotten) for 700–1000 years, is a much larger minority. There are also a lot of Tornedalians in the mining district around Kiruna and Gällivare, and the increasing restrictions on leisure, movement, fishing, and hunting for all but the reindeer-herding Sami minority are controversial and contested in Norrbotten.

Politics

Sámi political structures
Norway, Finland and Sweden all have Sámi Parliaments that to varying degrees are involved in governing the region—though mostly they only have authority over the matters of the Sámi citizens of the states in which they are situated.

Sámi Parliaments

Every Norwegian citizen registered as a Sámi has the right to vote in the elections for the Sámi Parliament of Norway. Elections are held every four years by direct vote from seven constituencies covering all of Norway (six of which are in Sápmi) and run parallel to the general Norwegian parliamentary elections. This is the Sámi Parliament with the most influence over any part of Sápmi, as it is involved in the autonomy established by the Finnmark Act. The parliament is in Kárášjohka and its current president is Aili Keskitalo from the Norwegian Sámi Association.

The Sámi Parliament of Sweden, situated in Kiruna (Northern Sámi: Giron), is elected by a general vote where all registered Sámi citizens of Sweden may attend. The current president is Lars-Anders Baer.

Voting for elections to the Sámi Parliament of Finland is restricted to inhabitants of the Sámi Domicile Area. The Parliament is in Inari, and its current president is Pekka Aikio.

In Russia, there is no Sámi Parliament. There are two Sámi organisations that are members of the national umbrella organisation of indigenous peoples, the Russian Association of Indigenous Peoples of the North (RAIPON), and represent the Russian Sámi in the Sámi Council. RAIPON is represented in Russia's Public Chamber by Pavel Sulyandziga. On 14 December 2008, the first Congress of the Russian Sámi took place. The Conference decided to demand the formation of a Russian Sámi Parliament, to be elected by the local Sámi. A suggestion to have the Russian Federation pick representatives for the Parliament was voted down with a clear majority. The Congress also chose a Council of Representatives that were to work for the establishment of a parliament and otherwise represent the Russian Sámi. It is headed by Valentina Sovkina.

Sámi Parliamentary Council
On 2 March 2000, the Sámi parliaments of Norway and Finland founded the Sámi Parliamentary Council, and the Sámi Parliament of Sweden joined two years later. Each parliament sends seven representatives, and observers are sent from the Sámi organisations of Russia and the Sámi Council. The Sámi Parliamentary Council discuss cross-border cooperation, hand out the annual Gollegiella language development award, and represent the Sámi people abroad.

Saami Council
In addition to the parliaments and their common council, there is a Saami Council based on Saami organisations. This council also organises interstate cooperation between the Saami, and also often represents the Saami in international fora such as the Barents Region. This organisation is older than the Parliamentary Council, but not connected to the parliaments except that some of the NGOs double as party lists in Sami parliament elections.

Russian side

The Russian side of Sápmi is within Murmansk Oblast. Oblasts are governed by popularly elected parliaments and formally headed by governors. The governors are nominated by the president of Russia and accepted or rejected by the local parliaments. However, should the parliament refuse to accept the president's nominee, the president is entitled to dissolve parliament and call local elections.

Murmansk Oblast covers the Kola Peninsula and is home to Murmansk, the largest city north of the Arctic Circle and in the Sápmi. It is subdivided into several districts, of which the geographically largest is Lovozersky District. This is also part of Russia where the Sami population is most numerous and visible.

The Lapland Nature Reserve (Laplandskiy zapovednik) is a Russian zapovednik (strict nature reserve) in Murmansk Oblast, above the Arctic Circle. Its administrative centre is the rural locality of Laplandsky Zapovednik.

Norwegian side
The counties of Norway are governed by popularly elected assemblies, headed by county mayors. Formally, the counties are headed by county governors, but in practice, these have limited influence today.

The largest of Norway's landscapes, Finnmárku (Northern Sami) or Finnmark (Norwegian), is in Sápmi and has a special form of autonomy: 95 % (about ) of the area is owned by the Finnmark Estate. The board of the Estate consists of equally many representatives from the Sami Parliament of Norway and Finnmark's county council. The two institutions appoint leaders of the board alternately. The administrative centre of Finnmárku (Finnmark) is Čáhcesuolu or Vadsø, in the far east of the county. The current county governor is Runar Sjåstad from the Norwegian Labour Party.

Romsa or Tromsø is southwest of Finnmárku. Its administrative centre is the city after which the county is named, Romsa or Tromsø. Romsa is North Norway's biggest city and Sápmi's biggest city after Murmansk. Current fylkesordfører is Terje Olsen from the Conservative Party. A similar solution to the Finnmark Estate, Hålogalandsallmenningen, has been proposed for Romsa county and its southern neighbour Nordlánda.

Nordland covers a long strip of coast that includes both North Sami, Julev Sami, Bithun Sami, and South Sami areas. Its administrative centre is Bådåddjo or Bodø. The current county governor is Mariette Korsrud from the Norwegian Labour Party.

The southernmost parts of Norwegian Sapmi lie in Nord-Trøndelag and partially in Sør-Trøndelag, the administrative centres of which are Steinkjer and Trondheim respectively. The latter city is outside Sápmi but is well known for being the site of the first international Sami conference in February 1917. The county governors are Gunnar Viken (the Conservative Party) in Nord-Trøndelag and Tore Sandvik (Norwegian Labour Party) in Sør-Trøndelag.

Swedish side
Lapland is a large northwestern province of Sweden, wholly within Sápmi. The traditional provinces of Sweden are cultural and historical entities; for administrative and political purposes they were replaced by the counties of Sweden (län) in 1634.

Five counties are wholly or partially within Sápmi. Län is formally governed by the landshövding, who is an envoy of the government and runs the government-appointed länsstyrelse that coordinates administration with national political goals for the county. Much of county politics is run by the county council or landsting, which is elected by the inhabitants of the county; but the counties' top positions are still determined by those who win the general elections of Sweden.

Norrbotten is mostly covered by Sápmi, although the lower Tornedalen region is often excluded. The administrative centre is Luleå in the Julev Sami area (Norrbotten includes North, Julev and Bithun areas). Current landshövding is Per-Ola Eriksson of the Centre Party.

Sápmi covers the interior majority of Västerbotten, which are Ubmeje and South Sami regions. The administrative centre is Umeå, and the current landshövding is Chris Heister from the conservative Moderate Party.

Västernorrland is an old part of Sapmi and still is. There are a lot of Sami on the coast of the Baltic Sea (Gulf of Bothnia).

Jämtland is sometimes considered a part of the Sápmi cultural region, and is a South Sami county. The administrative centre is Östersund. Current landshövding is Jöran Hägglund from the centre party Centerpartiet.

Finnish side
Finland is subdivided into nineteen regions (maakunta). The regions are governed by regional councils, which are generally forums of cooperation between the municipalities and are not elected by direct popular vote. Lapland (Lappi) is the northernmost of the regions, which stretches farther south than Sápmi. North Sami, Skolt Sami, and Aanaar Sami are indigenous to the region.

Four municipalities in the northern part of Finnish Lapland constitute the Sami Domicile Area, Sámiid Ruovttoguovlu, a region that is autonomous on issues regarding Sami culture and language.

Coats of Arms of Sami Communities

Sports 
The region has its football team, the Sápmi football team, which is organised by FA Sápmi. It is a member of ConIFA and the host of 2014 ConIFA World Football Cup. Sápmi football team won the 2006 VIVA World Cup and hosted the 2008 event.

The Tour de Barents is a cross-country skiing race held in the region.

Notable places
The following towns and villages have a significant Sami population or host Sami institutions. Norwegian, Swedish, Finnish, or Russian toponyms are in parentheses.

North Sámi area
 Deatnu (Tana) has a significant Sami population.
 Divtasvuodna (Tysfjord) is a centre for the Lule (Julev) Sami population. The Árran Lule-Sami centre is here.
 Eanodat (Enontekiö).
 Gáivuotna (Kåfjord) is an important centre for the Coastal Sami culture, which is host to the Riddu Riđđu international indigenous festival each summer. The municipality has a Sami language centre and hosts the Ája Sami Centre. The opposition against Sami language and culture revitalization in Gáivuotna was infamous in the late 1990s and included Sami language road signs being shot to pieces repeatedly.
 Giron (Kiruna) is the seat of the Swedish Sami Parliament and the largest urban settlement in Swedish Lapland.
 Guovdageaidnu (Kautokeino): About 90% of the population speak North Sami, and several Sami institutions are here. These include Beaivváš Sami Theatre, a Sami High School and Reindeer Herding School, the Sami University College, the Nordic Sami Research Institute, the Sami Language Board, the Resource Centre for the Rights of Indigenous People, and the International Centre For Reindeer Husbandry. In addition, several Sami media are based in Kautokeino. These include the Sami language newspaper Áššu and the DAT Sami publishing house/record company. Kautokeino also hosts the Sami Easter Festival. The Kautokeino rebellion in 1852 is one of the few Sami rebellions against the Norwegian government's oppression of the Sami.
 Jiellevárri or Váhčir (Gällivare)
 Johkamohkki (Jokkmokk) holds a large Sami market and festival the first weekend of every February. It is also the location of Ájtte.
 Kárášjohka (Karasjok) is the seat of the Norwegian Sami Parliament. Also other important Sami institutions including NRK Sami Radio, the Sami Collections museum, the Sami Art Centre, the Sami Specialist Library, the legal office of Middle Finnmark, the Inner Finnmark Child and Youth Psychiatric Policlinic, the Sami Specialist Medical Centre, and the Sami Health Research Institute. In addition, the Sápmi cultural park is in the township, and the Sami language Min Áigi newspaper is published here.
 Leavdnja (Lakselv) in Porsáŋgu (Porsanger) municipality is the location of the Finnmark Estate, and the Ságat Sami newspaper. The Finnmarkseiendommen organization owns and manages about 95% of the land in Finnmark, and 50% of its board members are elected by the Norwegian Sami Parliament.
 Ohcejohka (Utsjoki).
 Romsa or Tromsa (Tromsø) is the largest city in the Central Sami area and has a university that specialises in Sami subjects. It also has a notable and very active Sami population.
 Unjárga (Nesseby) is an important centre for the Coastal Sami culture. It is also the site for the Várjjat Sami Museum and the Norwegian Sami Parliament's department of culture and environment. The first Sami to be elected into the Norwegian Parliament, Isak Saba, was born here.

South Sápmi
 Aarborte (Hattfjelldal) is a southern Sami centre with a southern-Sami language school and a Sami culture centre.
 Arjeplog.
 Snåase (Snåsa) is a centre for the Southern Sami language, and the only municipality in Norway where Southern Sami is an official language. The Saemien Sijte southern Sami museum is in Snåase.

East Sápmi
Aanaar, Anár, or Aanar (Inari) is the seat of the Finnish Sami Parliament
Lujávri (Lovozero) is the largest settlement of Sami on the Russian side.

See also

Cuisine of Lapland
Environmental racism in Europe
French Geodesic Mission to Lapland
Inari
Laestadian
Lapland War
Laponian area—a UNESCO World Heritage Site protecting the Sami homelands in Sweden
Lapland Biosphere Reserve

References

Notes

Citations

Sources
A Norwegian Government report
Swedish Sami Parliament web page

External links
 

 
Lands inhabited by indigenous peoples
Sámi
Historical regions in Russia
Geography of Finland
Regions of Norway
Regions of Sweden
Geography of Northern Europe
Geography of Eastern Europe
Geography of Scandinavia
Regions of the Arctic
Cultural regions
Divided regions